Batu Caves Komuter station is a Malaysian commuter railway station formerly known as Batu Caves Railway station at Batu Caves, Gombak District, Selangor, Malaysia. After redevelopment, the station was reopened in August 2010. The station was from 2010 the northern terminus for the KTM Komuter's Batu Caves–Port Klang Route until December 2015 when the Seremban Line routing was changed to terminate at this station instead of Rawang.

History
The Batu Caves railway station was constructed on 1 November 1905. Over the years, the station fell into a poor condition through neglect and lack of use. The line between Sentul and Batu Caves was not included in the double-tracking and electrification of the line between Kuala Lumpur and Sentul under the Sixth Malaysia Plan (1990-1995). Since then, the station has been rebuilt and the line electrified. The existing single railway track between Sentul to Batu Caves was doubled, and new stations and halts built, including  Taman Wahyu,  Kampung Batu, and  Batu Kentonmen. This project was scheduled to start before 2001, with DRB-Hicom Berhad as a contractor. The letter of intent was issued by the Transport Ministry to the company on 13 April 2001. However, no letter of award was issued and there was no progress until 17 November 2006 when site possession was given to contractor YTL Corporation. The project was expected to be completed by April 2010, but the new station was opened in August 2010.

Around the station
 Batu Caves

See also
 Rail transport in Malaysia

References

Gombak District
Railway stations in Selangor
Seremban Line